The 2018–19 New Hampshire Wildcats women's basketball team represents the University of New Hampshire during the 2018–19 NCAA Division I women's basketball season. The Wildcats, led by ninth-year head coach Maureen Magarity, play their home games in Lundholm Gym and are members of the America East Conference.

Media
All non-televised home games and conference road games stream on either ESPN3 or AmericaEast.tv. Select home games air on Fox College Sports, Live Well Network, or WBIN. Most road games stream on the opponent's website. All conference home games and select non-conference home games are broadcast on the radio on WPKX, WGIR and online on the New Hampshire Portal.

Roster

Schedule

|-
!colspan=9 style=| Non-conference regular season

|-
!colspan=9 style=| America East regular season

|-
!colspan=9 style=| America East Women's Tournament

Rankings

See also
 2018–19 New Hampshire Wildcats men's basketball team

References

New Hampshire
New Hampshire Wildcats women's basketball seasons
New Hamp
New Hamp